Kärrbo is a village situated in Skinnskatteberg Municipality, Västmanland County, Sweden with 52 inhabitants in 2010.

References 

Populated places in Västmanland County
Populated places in Skinnskatteberg Municipality